Et in Arcadia ego (also known as Les bergers d'Arcadie or The Arcadian Shepherds) is a 1637–38 painting by Nicolas Poussin (1594–1665), the leading painter of the classical French Baroque style. It depicts a pastoral scene with idealized shepherds from classical antiquity, and a woman, possibly a shepherdess, gathered around an austere tomb that includes this inscription. It is held in the Louvre.

Poussin painted two versions of the subject under the same title. His earlier version, painted in 1627, is held at Chatsworth House. An earlier treatment of the theme was painted by Guercino circa 1618–1622, also titled Et in Arcadia ego.

Inspiration

A tomb with a memorial inscription (to Daphnis) amid the idyllic settings of Arcadia is first described in Virgil's Eclogues V 42 ff. Virgil took the idealized Sicilian rustics included in the Idylls of Theocritus and set them in the primitive Greek region of Arcadia (see Eclogues VII and X). The idea was taken up anew in the circle of Lorenzo de' Medici in the 1460s and 1470s, during the Florentine Renaissance.

In his pastoral work Arcadia (1504), Jacopo Sannazaro fixed the Early Modern perception of Arcadia as a lost world of idyllic bliss, remembered in regretful dirges. The first pictorial representation of the familiar memento mori theme, which was popularized in 16th-century Venice, now made more concrete and vivid by the inscription ET IN ARCADIA EGO, is Guercino's version, painted between 1618 and 1622. (It is held in the Galleria Nazionale d'Arte Antica, Rome.) The inscription gains force from the prominent presence of a skull in the foreground, beneath which the words are carved.

1627 version

Poussin's own first version of the painting (now in Chatsworth House) was probably commissioned as a reworking of Guercino's version. It is in a more Baroque style than the later version, and is characteristic of Poussin's early work. In the Chatsworth painting, the shepherds are discovering the half-hidden and overgrown tomb, and are reading the inscription with curious expressions. The woman, standing at the left, is posed in sexually suggestive fashion, very different from her austere counterpart in the later version, which is based on a statue from antiquity known as the Cesi Juno. The later version has a far more geometric composition and the figures are much more contemplative.

Interpretation
The literal translation of "Et in Arcadia Ego" is "Even in Arcadia, there am I". Poussin's earliest biographer, Giovan Pietro Bellori, understood the 'I' of the phrase to refer to Death, thus making the painting a memento mori, reminding the viewer that even in the blissful utopia of Arcadia, death still exists. Another biographer, André Félibien, interpreted the 'I' to refer to the occupant of the tomb, but still took the overall meaning of the painting to be a reminder that death is present even in idyllic Arcadia.

The vagueness of the phrase is the subject of a famous essay by the art historian Erwin Panofsky, who suggested that, compared to Poussin's 1627 version, this second version shifted the focus from a warning about the inevitability of death to a contemplation of the past and a sense of nostalgia.

Sculpted versions

This undated, mid-eighteenth-century marble bas-relief is part of the Shepherds Monument, a garden feature at Shugborough House, Staffordshire, England. Beneath it is the cryptic Shugborough inscription, as yet undeciphered. The reversed composition suggests that it was copied from an engraving, the compositions of which are commonly reversed because direct copies to the plate produce mirror images on printing.

In 1832 another relief was sculpted as part of the monument marking Poussin's tomb in Rome, on which it appears beneath a bust of the artist. In the words of art historian Richard Verdi, it appears as if the shepherds are contemplating "their own author's death."

See also
 Et in Arcadia ego (Guercino)

Notes

References

Further reading
 Verdi, Richard, "On the Critical Fortunes – And Misfortunes – Of Poussin's 'Arcadia'", The Burlington Magazine, Vol. 121, No. 911 (Feb., 1979), pp. 95–107

 Panofsky, Erwin and Gerda, "The „Tomb in Arcady“ at the „Fin-de-Siècle“", Wallraf-Richartz-Jahrbuch, 30 (1968), pp. 287–304. 
 Patton, Guy "Poussin's Arcadian Vision: Search for the Golden Age", Amazon books, 2014

External links

Marc Wiesmann, "Classical Arcadia"
S. Hamblett: Time, Truth & Poussin`s Arcadian Tomb
Guercino's painting illustrated at the official Galleria Barberini website (text in Italian)

Ancient Arcadia
Ancient Greece in art and culture
Greek mythology studies
Iconography
Latin mottos
Paintings about death
Paintings by Nicolas Poussin
Paintings in the Louvre by French artists
Priory of Sion hoax